The Corpse Came C.O.D. is a 1947 American comedy-mystery film directed by Henry Levin, produced by Samuel Bischoff and starring George Brent and Joan Blondell. The comedic mystery is notable for featuring cameos by Hollywood gossip columnists appearing as themselves: Harrison Carroll, Jimmy Fidler, George Fisher, Hedda Hopper, Erskine Johnson, Louella Parsons, and Sidney Skolsky. The movie is based on a novel by columnist Jimmy Starr, who also appears in the movie.

Plot
Two reporters who are in love (Brent and Blondell) compete with each other when covering the story about the discovery of a corpse found at the mansion of a famous Hollywood movie actress.

Cast
 George Brent as Joe Medford
 Joan Blondell as Rosemary Durant
 Adele Jergens as Mona Harrison
 Jim Bannon as Det. Lt. Mark Wilson
 Leslie Brooks as Peggy Holmes
 John Berkes as Larry Massey, Photographer
 Fred F. Sears as Det. Dave Short (as Fred Sears)
 William Trenk as Fields
 Grant Mitchell as Mitchell Edwards
 Una O'Connor as Nora
 Marvin Miller as Rudy Frasso

References

External links
 
 
 
 
 The Corpse Came C.O.D. (1947) and the Hollywood Gossip Columnists, Immortal Ephemera

1948 films
Columbia Pictures films
American black-and-white films
Films set in Los Angeles
1940s crime comedy films
Films scored by George Duning
1940s English-language films
Films about journalists
American crime comedy films
American comedy mystery films
Films produced by Samuel Bischoff
Films based on crime novels
1948 comedy films
1947 comedy films
1947 films
Films directed by Henry Levin
1940s American films